Governor Douglas may refer to:

Francis Douglas, 1st Baron Douglas of Barloch (1889–1980), Governor of Malta from 1946 to 1949
Howard Douglas (1776–1861), 3rd Lieutenant-Governor of New Brunswick from 1824 to 1831
Jim Douglas (born 1951), 80th Governor of Vermont
John Douglas (governor) (1835–1885), Governor of British Ceylon in 1883
Walter Douglas (governor) (1670–1739), Governor-General of the Leeward Islands from 1711 to 1716
William Lewis Douglas (1845–1924), 42nd Governor of Massachusetts